"Gloria" is a song by the alternative rock band Mando Diao, and their second single from Give Me Fire. The single was released on 15 May 2009.

Music video
The music video featured Gloria, a convicted escapee on the run from government officials, seeking refuge in a movie theater. The parallels between what are scenes from the feature presentation and what is actually occurring becomes diluted as the video progresses, culminating in what appears to be Gloria's apprehension by the government agents on a rooftop.  However, this proves to be a false climax as the agents then enter the theater. One of them points at the projected image on the screen and the three agents approach it, believing it to be Gloria.  Meanwhile, Gloria is actually sitting in the theater, a couple of rows in front of the band.  She stands up and sneaks out of the theater undetected.

Charts

Weekly charts

Year-end charts

References

External links

2009 singles
Mando Diao songs
Songs written by Björn Dixgård
Songs written by Gustaf Norén
2008 songs
EMI Records singles